Scott Alan is an American songwriter who has released eight albums, beginning with his debut album, Dreaming Wide Awake (2007).

Discography
 Dreaming Wide Awake
 Keys
 What I Wanna Be When I Grow Up
 LIVE
 Anything Worth Holding on To
 Greatest Hits: Volume One
 Cynthia Erivo and Oliver Tompsett Sing Scott Alan [Deluxe Edition]
 Lifeline

References

Living people
Year of birth missing (living people)
Place of birth missing (living people)
American male songwriters